Madha is a 2019 Indian Telugu-language medical thriller film directed by Srividya Basawa (in his directorial debut) and starring Trishna Mukherjee and Rahul Venkat.

Plot

Cast  
Trishna Mukherjee as Nisha
Rahul Venkat as Arjun
Bikramjeet Kanwarpal as Balasubramaniam
Anish Kuruvilla as Ravi Varma

Production 
Sri Vidya Basawa conceptualized the film in 2011. Initially, the venture was supposed to be an independent film before it was made into a feature film.  The film is of the thriller genre and much of the crew of the film are relatively newcomers and marks the directorial debut of the director. The low-budget film began shooting in June 2017 and commenced in September 2017.

Themes 
According to the director Sri Vidya Basawa, Madha means "madness personified" in Sanskrit.

Release and reception 
The film released on 13 March 2020 and was removed from theatres two days later due to the COVID-19 pandemic.

The News Minute gave the film a rating of one out of five stars and stated that "All in all, Madha, somewhere at its core, had a decent plot. Between a low budget, bad actors, and incoherent screenplay, it loses its essence". Idlebrain noted that "Despite some shortcomings, Madha will stay as a nice attempt with good script/technical work". Film Companion wrote that "But for all that it gets wrong, Madha does more things right". The Times of India gave the film a rating of three out of five stars and stated that "Madha is a well-written thriller, penned by Prashanth Sagar Atlluri and helmed by Vidya, majorly because the duo does not indulge in clichés specific to the genre. This is one gripping thriller that’s worth a watch".

The film was available on Amazon Prime Video in April 2020.

Awards and nominations 
 Noida International Film Festival 2019 - Best Feature
 SIIMA Award for Best Debut Producer - Telugu for Third Eye Productions

References

External links 

Indian thriller films
2019 films
2019 thriller films
2019 directorial debut films
2010s Telugu-language films